Elections for a General National Congress (GNC) were held in Libya on 7 July 2012, having been postponed from 19 June. They were the first elections since the overthrow and death of longtime ruler Muammar Gaddafi a year earlier, the first free national elections since 1952, and only the second free national elections since Libya gained independence in 1951.

Once elected, the General National Congress was to appoint a Prime Minister and Cabinet. The GNC was originally to be charged with appointing a Constituent Assembly to draw up Libya's new constitution in an interim period of 18–22 months before a constitutional referendum and new elections on that basis, but the National Transitional Council (NTC) announced on 5 July that the Assembly would instead be directly elected at a later date.

Despite threats of a boycott, a majority of Libyans (61.58%) cast a ballot. However, the election was marred by violence, protests and a number of deaths.

Electoral system
A draft election law was published on 1 January 2012 on the website of the High National Election Commission (HNEC), after which public comments were accepted. The draft law proposed electing 200 representatives, of which at least 10% should be women, unless fewer than 10% of candidates were women. Members of the NTC and Jamahiriya government members, including relatives of Muammar Gaddafi, were barred from running.

The second draft abolished the women's quota and allowed local NTC council members to run in the election; it also changed the electoral system from countrywide to constituency-based. Following further protests against restrictions for dual nationals and other issues, the release of the electoral law was again postponed to 28 January 2012. The NTC also sought the input of the Libyan Women's Platform for Peace, who had proposed an alternative electoral law and criticized the official draft on four key points relating to dual nationals, lack of a women's quota, inadequate countermeasures against corruption and the risk of incentivizing tribal party formation.

A new electoral law was finally drafted on 28–29 January 2012. The election system will be a form of parallel voting, with 64 constituency seats (with independent candidates only) and 136 list seats for party lists. Lists will have to alternate between male and female candidates, in effect ensuring a women's quota. The age required to stand for election was lowered to 21 years, and citizens with dual nationality will be allowed to vote and run in the election. Further changes were later made, changing the ratio to 120 constituency seats and 80 list seats, reportedly in an attempt to reduce the Muslim Brotherhood's influence in the new parliament. The 120 constituency seats would be elected from 69 constituencies, whilst the 80 list seats would be elected in 20 constituencies.

Voter registration
Registration of voters, parties participating in elections and independent candidates started at 1 May, and was due to finish on 14 May. However, following a call for a boycott of the process by the Council of Cyrenaica, which is seeking autonomy for parts of eastern Libya around the city of Benghazi, the deadline was extended until 21 May. In total 2,865,937 voters, or 80% of the estimated 3 million to 3.5 million electorate, registered for the elections. The registration process was supervised by the United Nations Support Mission in Libya.

Minority groups, such as the Tawerghans, who had been accused of supporting former leader Muammar Gaddafi, said that the election was futile as they are marginalised. They also added that voter registration was difficult. Yet about 90 percent of Tawerghans living in Janzour Naval Academy refugee camp registered to vote.

Campaign
A total of 374 party lists registered to contest the 80 party list seats, together with 2,639 candidates for the 120 constituency seats. The four parties that were expected to dominate the election are the National Front Party, the Justice and Construction Party, the National or Homeland Party and the National Forces Alliance. The National Front Party is linked to the National Front for the Salvation of Libya (NFSL), a former anti-Gaddafi resistance group formed in the 1980s. It is led by Mohamed el-Magariaf, an intellectual based in Eastern Libya. The Justice and Construction Party is the political arm of the Muslim Brotherhood in Libya. The Homeland Party is an Islamist party as well, led by the Islamic cleric Ali al-Sallabi and Abdelhakim Belhadj, the former emir of the Libyan Islamic Fighting Group (LIFG). The National Forces Alliance is a liberal umbrella coalition around ex-interim prime minister Mahmoud Jibril, who himself did not run for a seat in the GNC.

The Libyan Popular National Movement, a political party supporting the policies of Gaddafi, was banned from participating in the elections.

Conduct
Voting was disrupted in some parts of the country, with 6% of the 6,629 polling stations unable to open normally. However all but eight polling stations managed to open up for voters during the day and the remaining eight, including two in the Kufra area, which had seen clashes between Toubous and government forces, opened the following day. In the Benghazi area a polling station was attacked by activists seeking autonomy for the east of the country and an election official was killed by a gun attack on a helicopter carrying voting materials on the day before the election. In eastern Libya former rebels closed five oil terminals at Brega, Ra's Lanuf and Sidra for 48 hours in an attempt to disrupt the elections. In Ajdabiya a pro-federalism protester was shot dead by locals when he tried to steal a ballot box from a polling station. Officials with the HNEC were denied access to Bani Walid by tribal Gaddafi loyalists who control the city, and could not monitor the voting process.

Around 1.7 million of 2.8 million registered voters participated in the elections.

Results

According to first counts, the liberal National Forces Alliance did well in the northern areas except Misrata, whereas the race was more even in the south. The other key contenders were the Islamic Justice and Construction Party, which came in second, and Al-Watan, which in the end won no seats at all.

On 17 July, the High National Election Commission announced provisional results. In the 80 proportional seats, Mahmoud Jibril's National Forces Alliance (NFA) received 48.1%, winning 39 seats. This was followed by the Justice and Construction Party (JCP), which received 10.3% and 17 seats and third was the National Front Party with 4.1% and three seats. The Union for the Homeland and the National Centrist Party also took two seats, as did the Wadi Al-Hayah Party for Democracy and Development. Fifteen other parties won one party list seat each.

The affiliation of the 120 independents is obscure but the election for Prime Minister gave some indication: in the first round Mahmoud Jibril (NFA) got 86 votes, Mustafa Abushagur (independent) got 55 votes and Awad Barasi (JCP) got 41 votes. Then Abushagur defeated Jibril with 96 to 94. It is estimated that 25 independents are associated with the NFA, 17 with Justice and Construction, and 23 are Salafis.

References

External links
High National Election Commission 

Elections in Libya
Libya
2012 in Libya
July 2012 events in Africa
Election and referendum articles with incomplete results